His Wife's Child is a 1913 American short silent film drama directed by Harry Solter and starring Earle Foxe, Florence Lawrence and Matt Moore in the lead roles.

Cast

Florence Lawrence
Matt Moore
Earle Foxe
Charles Craig
Jack Newton
Leonora von Ottinger
Percy Standing
Jane Carter

See also
 List of American films of 1908

External links

American silent short films
1913 drama films
1913 films
American black-and-white films
Films directed by Harry Solter
1913 short films
Silent American drama films
1910s American films